Mohammad-Hadi Imanieh (born 1962) is an Iranian physician and conservative politician who currently serves as the governor of Fars Province, since 29 September 2021

References

1962 births
Living people
Governors of Fars
Alumni of King's College London
Tehran University of Medical Sciences alumni
Shiraz University of Medical Sciences alumni
People from Shiraz